Durham Castle is a Norman castle in the city of Durham, England, which has been occupied since 1837 by University College, Durham after its previous role as the residence of the Bishops of Durham. Designated since 1986 as a cultural World Heritage Site in England, along with Durham Cathedral, the facility is open to the general public to visit, but only through guided tours, since it is in use as a working building and is home to over 100 students.  The castle stands on top of a hill above the River Wear on Durham's peninsula, opposite Durham Cathedral.

History

Early history
Construction of the Castle, which follows the usual motte and bailey design favoured by the Normans, began in 1072 under the orders of William the Conqueror, six years after the Norman conquest of England, and soon after the Normans first came to the North. The construction took place under the supervision of Waltheof, Earl of Northumbria, until he rebelled against William and was executed in 1076. Stone for the new buildings was cut from the cliffs below the walls and moved up using winches.

The holder of the office of the Bishop of Durham, Bishop Walcher at the time, was appointed by the king to exercise royal authority on his behalf, with the castle being his seat. According to UNESCO,

A UNESCO site describes the role of the Prince-Bishops in the "buffer state between England and Scotland":From 1075, the Bishop of Durham became a Prince-Bishop, with the right to raise an army, mint his own coins, and levy taxes. As long as he remained loyal to the king of England, he could govern as a virtually autonomous ruler, reaping the revenue from his territory, but also remaining mindful of his role of protecting England’s northern frontier.

The Bishops of Durham would not be stripped of their temporal powers until the Durham (County Palatine) Act 1836 returned them to the Crown.

Another UNESCO report more specifically explains the need for a castle at this location:"In defensive terms, Durham Castle was of strategic importance both to defend the troublesome border with Scotland and to control local English rebellions, which were common in the years immediately following the Norman Conquest, and led to the so-called Harrying of the North by William the Conqueror in 1069. ... the Castle was constructed 'to keep the bishop and his household safe from the attacks of assailants'. This makes sense – Robert de Comines (or Cumin), the first earl of Northumberland appointed by William the Conqueror, was brutally murdered along with his entourage in 1069".

In May 1080, the castle was attacked and besieged for four days by rebels from Northumbria; Bishop Walcher was killed. In 1177, King Henry II of England seized the castle after a disagreement with the then-bishop, Hugh de Puiset (sometimes known as Pudsey).  

In the 12th century, Bishop Pudsey (Hugh de Puiset) built the Norman archway and the Galilee of the cathedral. Other major alterations were made by Bishop Thomas Hatfield in the 1300s, including a rebuilding of the keep and enlargement of the keep mount.

The castle has a large Great Hall, originally called a Dining Hall, created by Bishop Antony Bek in the early 14th century; Bishop Hatfield added a wooden minstrels' gallery. The Hall was modified and enlarged, then reduced, in size by subsequent bishops.

University College

The Castle remained the bishop's palace for the Bishop of Durham until Auckland Castle was made the bishops' residence in 1832; the current bishop still maintains offices at that castle, roughly ten miles to the south. Subsequently, Durham castle was donated to the University of Durham by Bishop William Van Mildert and would later become the college. The college did not occupy the castle until 1837, after the next Bishop, Edward Maltby, had completed renovations of the building.

Chapels
The Norman Chapel is the oldest accessible part of the castle built about 1078. Its architecture is Anglian in nature, possibly due to forced Anglian labour being used to build it. In the 15th century, its three windows were all but blocked up because of the expanded keep. It thus fell into disuse until 1841 when it was used as a corridor through which to access the keep. During the Second World War, it was used as a command and observation post for the Royal Air Force when its original use was recognised. (The cathedral was targeted for a Baedeker Blitz or bombing raid by Germany but escaped because fog rolled in and blocked the pilots' view.)

The chapel was re-consecrated shortly after the war and is still used for weekly services by the college.

Tunstall's Chapel, named after Cuthbert Tunstall, was built in the 16th century and is used for worship within the college. It was modified in the 17th century by Bishop Cosin.

World Heritage Site
Durham Castle is jointly designated a UNESCO World Heritage Site with Durham Cathedral, a short distance across Palace Green.

The UNESCO report provides specifics about the Castle's important aspects: Within the Castle precinct are later buildings of the Durham Palatinate, reflecting the Prince-Bishops’ civic responsibilities and privileges. These include the Bishop’s Court (now a library), almshouses, and schools. Palace Green, a large open space connecting the various buildings of the site once provided the Prince Bishops with a venue for processions and gatherings befitting their status, and is now still a forum for public events.

See also
 Castles in Great Britain and Ireland
 List of castles in England

References

External links

 Durham Castle - Durham University
 Durham Castle - Durham World Heritage site
 A Tour of Durham Cathedral & Castle

Buildings and structures completed in the 11th century
Castle
World Heritage Sites in England
Houses in County Durham
Castles in County Durham
Grade I listed buildings in County Durham
Grade I listed castles
Grade I listed educational buildings
Buildings and structures of Durham University
Historic house museums in County Durham
Museums in Durham, England
Motte-and-bailey castles